Herlander Ribeiro (born 30 May 1943) is a Portuguese former freestyle swimmer. He competed at the 1960 Summer Olympics and the 1964 Summer Olympics.

References

External links
 

1943 births
Living people
Portuguese male freestyle swimmers
Olympic swimmers of Portugal
Swimmers at the 1960 Summer Olympics
Swimmers at the 1964 Summer Olympics
Swimmers from Lisbon